The telecommunication infrastructure of Singapore spans the entire city-state. Its development level is high, with close accessibility to the infrastructure from nearly all inhabited parts of the island and for all of the population, with exceptions. Today, the country is considered an international telecommunications hub, an achievement that was driven by Singapore's view that high-quality telecommunications is one of the critical factors that support its economic growth.

Background 
After reform initiatives, the Singaporean telecommunication industry became streamlined and largely directed by the government, which viewed such policy as critical in shaping societal preferences and in directing the state's economy. Being able to provide adequate telecommunications services is also critical when approached from the perspective that Singapore's legitimacy as a state rests on its capability to deliver a high standard of living to its citizens. Hence, beginning in the 1970s, the state pursued a three-phase strategy oriented towards developing world-class telecommunications infrastructure capable of high-quality telecommunications services.

The first phase involved the expansion of infrastructure to meet business and societal needs (e.g. service enhancement, reduction of waiting lists for telephone connections). The second phase involved the integration of telecommunications to the over-all state strategy, particularly in the area of services for banking, financial services, and tourism with the goal of tapping telecommunications in ensuring the competitive advantage for Singapore. The National Computer Board was formed during this period for the purpose of developing and adopting IT applications. In 1986, this agency issued Singapore's comprehensive National Information Technology Plan (NITP). By the late 1980s, the third phase commenced and it focused on bolstering Singapore's international role as well as the IT 2000, which was an ambitious plan to encourage new multimedia services, which is articulated in the promotion of Singapore as "an intelligent island".

The government's role in the telecommunication industry is best demonstrated in the case of Singtel, which the state controls through its investment company Temasek Holdings Private Limited. Singtel does not only roll out affordable but high-quality telecommunication services to the city's residents but it also pursues initiatives that will attract overseas companies to invest in the country.

Radio and television stations are all government-owned entities. All six television channels are owned by MediaCorp; its only other competitor, SPH MediaWorks closed its television channel on 1 January 2005. Due to the proximity of Singapore to Malaysia and Indonesia, almost all radios and television sets in Singapore can pick up broadcast signals from both countries. Private ownership of satellite dishes is banned, but most households have access to the StarHub TV and the Singtel IPTV TV(mio TV) network.

All radio stations are operated either by MediaCorp, the SAFRA National Service Association (SAFRA) or SPH UnionWorks.

As of 1998, there were almost 55 million phone lines in Singapore, close to 47 million of which also served other telecommunication devices like computers and facsimile machines. Underwater telephone cables have been laid that lead to Malaysia, the Philippines and Indonesia.

In 2002, Virgin Mobile in a joint venture with Singtel, set up the fourth telecommunications company in Singapore. It was the first mobile virtual network operator (MVNO) in Singapore. The operations were closed down on 11 October 2002 after failing to attract a significant number of customers. Failure of the joint venture was attributed to a saturated mobile market and Virgin Mobile's positioning as a "premium" brand.

As for internet facilities, as of 2009, there are four major internet service providers (ISPs) in Singapore. By February 2009, there were more than 4.8 million broadband users in Singapore. However, due to the small market and possible market collusion, there have been rising concerns that various ISPs' telecommunication infrastructures being highly under-utilised. In July 2015, Liberty Wireless signed an agreement with M1 Limited that allowed it to tap on M1's mobile network, thus becoming the first MVNO, operating as Circles Asia, in Singapore to offer a full service mobile network experience.

On 14 December 2016, TPG, an Australian ISP, won the bid to be Singapore's fourth telecommunications company at S$105 million. By 2019, due to the introduction of TPG and 9 MVNO entrants to the market, thus turning the market to be more competitive, the price of mobile plans had fallen.

As of January 2018, there are four cellular phone operators in Singapore serving more than 6.4 million cellular phones.

Telephones

Telephones – fixed line:

 Total Fixed Line Subscriptions: 1,901,100 (March 2022)
 Fixed Line Population Penetration: 34.9% (March 2022)

Telephones – mobile market:

 Total Mobile Subscriptions (3G+4G LTE): 8,831,100 (June 2022)
 Mobile Population Penetration: 158.8% (Dec 2021)
 Operators:
 MNOs:
Singtel (includes sub-brand GOMO and Heya)
 StarHub (includes sub-brand giga!)
 M1 (includes sub-brand M1 Maxx)
 SIMBA (formerly TPG Singapore)
 MVNOs:
CMLink SG (on Singtel's network)
VIVIFI (on Singtel's network)
Zero1 (on Singtel's network)
ZYM Mobile (on Singtel's network)
redONE (on StarHub's network)
 MyRepublic Mobile (on M1's network; on StarHub's network for 5G plans)
Changi Mobile (on M1's network)
Circles.Life (on M1's network)
Geenet mobile (on M1's network)
Gorilla Mobile (on M1's network)
ZΩH (on M1's network)
 Niche:
 GRID Communications (iDEN network)
 Former Operators:
 MVNOs:
 Grid Mobile (June 2019 - 6 December 2021) 
 Zero Mobile (on Singtel's network, license suspended on 12 Mar 2020)
 Virgin Mobile Singapore (on Singtel's network ceased operations in 2002)

Telephone system:
 Domestic: NA
 International: Submarine cables to several countries and territories including Malaysia (Sabah and Peninsular Malaysia), Indonesia, the Philippines, Hong Kong, Taiwan, and India; satellite earth stations – 2 Intelsat (1 Indian Ocean and 1 Pacific Ocean), and 1 Inmarsat (Pacific Ocean region)

IDD Country Code: +65

Radio

Radio broadcast stations (as of October 2021):AM 0, FM 18, shortwave 1 (Source: Asiawaves.net )

Radios:2.55 million (1997)

Television

Television broadcast stations (as of March 2020):
 6 free-to-air (6 digital, 6 high-definition)
Channel 5
Channel 8
Suria
Vasantham
Channel U
CNA (Channel NewsAsia)

Operators:
 Mediacorp - Free-to-Air TV Provider
 StarHub TV - Fibre IPTV Provider
 Singtel TV - Fibre IPTV Provider

Internet

Singapore has a large number of computer users and most households have computers and Internet access. A survey conducted by Infocomm Development Authority of Singapore indicated that 78% of households own computers at home and 7 in 10 households have Internet access (2006). The CIA's The World Factbook reports that Singapore has 2.422 million Internet users (2005) and 898,762 Internet hosts (2006).

Country code (Top level domain): SG

Internet Service Providers (ISPs): 6 (2019)

Broadband
 Subscribers: 12,067,200 (87.52% wireless, 12.06% optical fibre, 0.37% cable modem, 0.02% xDSL, 0.03% others) as of June 2019

Fiber Internet

Services are provided via NetLink Trust, to the residential and commercial entities. Whilst the services are via a single infrastructure, the Fiber itself are provided by Singtel and these are independent of the ISP Equipment. Currently the OLT are provided by Nucleus Connect and Singtel using Huawei, ZTE and Ericsson ONT. The current licensed Service Providers are Singtel, Starhub, M1, MyRepublic, ViewQwest and WhizComms. Singapore aims to have 95% household connection by the end of 2012 with speeds up to 1Gbit/s, typically where a customer usually subscribes to 100 to 200Mbit/s packages with Voice and IPTV on the platform.

While Nucleus Connect is the Operating Company (OpCo) of the NetLink Trust infrastructure, it is not the service provider, rather the company that switches the network to the respective ISPs.

Optical Fiber broadband providers:
 StarHub (RSP)
 M1 (RSP)
 Singtel (RSP)
 MyRepublic (RSP)
 ViewQwest (RSP)
 WhizComms (RSP)
 NetLink Trust (Passive Infrastructure Company ; NetCo ; Wholesale)
 Nucleus Connect (Active Infrastructure Company ; OpCo ; Wholesale)

Wireless@SG operators (Up to 5 Mbit/s):
 M1
 Singtel
 StarHub
 SIMBA

Mobile broadband providers:
 MNOs:
Singtel (includes sub-brand GOMO & heya)
 StarHub (includes sub-brand giga!)
 M1
 SIMBA (previously TPG Singapore)
 MVNOs:
Circles.Life (on M1's network)
Zero1 (on Singtel's network)
 MyRepublic (on StarHub's network; on M1's network w.e.f 31 March 2020 for new signups)
redONE (on StarHub's network)
VIVIFI (on Singtel's network)
geenet mobile (on M1's network)
CMLink SG (on Singtel's network)
Changi mobile (on M1's network)
Gorilla Mobile (on M1's network)
Zym Mobile (on Singtel's network)
ZΩH (on M1's network)

References

Others
 Terry Johal, "Controlling the Internet: The use of legislation and its effectiveness in Singapore (pdf file)", Proceedings, 15th Biennial Conference of the Asian Studies Association of Australia, Canberra, 2004.

External links 
 Ministry Of Information, Communications And The Arts, Singapore
 Media Development Authority (MDA), Singapore
 Infocomm Development Authority (IDA), Singapore
 IDA, Singapore Infocomm Statistics at a Glance, Singapore
 Wireless@SG, Singapore
 Press in Singapore
 Singapore Wireless Guide